James Mina (born 17 July 1954) is a Colombian footballer. He played in three matches for the Colombia national football team in 1983. He was also part of Colombia's squad for the 1979 Copa América tournament.

References

External links
 

1954 births
Living people
Colombian footballers
Colombia international footballers
Place of birth missing (living people)
Association football goalkeepers
Independiente Santa Fe footballers
Once Caldas footballers
Deportes Quindío footballers